Timothy Donovan (born February 20, 1967) is an American former professional tennis player.

Donovan is originally from Pittsburgh and is the youngest of eleven children. He played four years of collegiate tennis in the late 1980s for Brown University, where he was twice named Ivy League Player of the Year. Ranked as high as sixth in the NCAA Division I, he has since been inducted into the Brown University Hall of Fame.

Competing professionally after college, Donovan reached a best world ranking of 346. In 1989 he made the quarter-finals of the 1989 Livingston Open, with wins over Sammy Giammalva Jr. and the seventh-seeded Paul Annacone.

References

External links
 
 

1967 births
Living people
American male tennis players
Brown Bears men's tennis players
Tennis players from Pittsburgh